The 1908 season was the ninth in Chicago White Sox history and its eighth as a major league team. Owner Charles Comiskey optioned land in the summer of 1908 for what would become Comiskey Park. Despite ace pitcher Ed Walsh going an incredible 40–15 in 1908, the Sox could only muster a 3rd-place finish in the American League standings, behind Detroit and Cleveland, ultimately finishing 88–64. The White Sox hit only three home runs for the entire season, the lowest total for a major league team in the modern era (since 1901).

Regular season

Season standings

Record vs. opponents

Roster

Player stats

Batting

Starters by position 
Note: Pos = Position; G = Games played; AB = At bats; H = Hits; Avg. = Batting average; HR = Home runs; RBI = Runs batted in

Other batters 
Note: G = Games played; AB = At bats; H = Hits; Avg. = Batting average; HR = Home runs; RBI = Runs batted in

Pitching

Starting pitchers 
Note: G = Games pitched; IP = Innings pitched; W = Wins; L = Losses; ERA = Earned run average; SO = Strikeouts

Other pitchers 
Note: G = Games pitched; IP = Innings pitched; W = Wins; L = Losses; ERA = Earned run average; SO = Strikeouts

Relief pitchers 
Note: G = Games pitched; W = Wins; L = Losses; SV = Saves; ERA = Earned run average; SO = Strikeouts

Notes

References 
1908 Chicago White Sox at Baseball Reference

Chicago White Sox seasons
Chicago White Sox season
Chicago White Sox